Kyle James Storer (born 30 April 1987) is an English footballer who currently plays for Nuneaton Borough as a midfielder.

Club career
In July 2015, Storer signed for National League club Cheltenham Town. In October 2016, he made his first League Two appearance for the club in a match against Crawley Town.

In January 2018, Storer left Cheltenham Town and signed for National League club Solihull Moors.

In November 2019 he made his 600th career appearance against Oxford City in the FA Cup 

Storer departed Solihull Moors in January 2023 after five years with the club. On 9 January 2023, Storer rejoined Nuneaton Borough.

Career statistics

Honours
Cheltenham Town
National League: 2015–16

Individual
National League Team of the Year: 2015–16

References

External links

1987 births
Living people
Sportspeople from Nuneaton
English footballers
Association football midfielders
Leicester City F.C. players
Tamworth F.C. players
Hinckley United F.C. players
Atherstone Town F.C. players
Nuneaton Borough F.C. players
Kidderminster Harriers F.C. players
Wrexham A.F.C. players
Cheltenham Town F.C. players
Solihull Moors F.C. players
National League (English football) players
English Football League players
England semi-pro international footballers
Expatriate footballers in Wales